Milan Damnjanović may refer to:
 Milan Damnjanović (philosopher) (1924–1994), philosopher, professor at the Faculty of Fine Arts of University of Belgrade
 Milan Damnjanović (physicist) (born 1953), Serbian physicist, professor at the Faculty of Physics of the University of Belgrade